"Aromatoleum" is a genus of bacteria capable of microbial biodegradation of organic pollutants. It has one single described species member, A. aromaticum, for which the only strain is strain EbN1.

This taxonomy is accepted by the NCBI taxonomy database, and consequently by many bioinformatic databases. However, it the strain EbN1 has not been described in detail, therefore, according to the International Code of Nomenclature of Bacteria, the name "Aromatoleum aromaticum" is not valid and should be officially referred to as Azoarcus sp. EbN1 as it belongs to the Azoarcus/Thauera cluster. The discovery of the strain was published in 1995, and was subsequently referred to in the literature as "Aromatoleum aromaticum" and cited as "(Rabus, unpublished data)".

A. aromaticum strain EbN1 has been fully sequenced by the same researchers who discovered it and coworkers. It has one chromosome and two plasmids, encoding for 10 anaerobic and 4 aerobic aromatic degradation pathways. The genome is rich in paralogous gene clusters, mobile gene elements, and genes similar to that from other bacteria, suggesting a history full of horizontal gene transfer events. The bacterium has a well-regulated metabolic network. Unlike many species in Azoarcus proper, it is incapable of fixing nitrogen.

References 

Biodegradation
Bacteria genera
Monotypic bacteria genera